Dr Samantha George is a Senior Lecturer in Literature in the Social Sciences, Arts & Humanities Research Institute at the University of Hertfordshire. She completed a PhD at the University of York in 2004, then taught in the Department of English Literature at Sheffield University till taking up her post at Hertfordshire in 2007. She is known for her research on eighteenth century literature and science with a particular emphasis on the role of women and botany.

She is also known for her work on Gothic and vampire literature and culture, and is the convener of the 'Open Graves, Open Minds: Vampires and the Undead in Modern Culture' (OGOM) research project at the University of Hertfordshire.  In 2010, she organized the first Open Graves, Open Minds: Vampires and the Undead in Modern Culture conference, which achieved international coverage. In 2012 a symposium to mark the centenary of Bram Stoker's death was held.

In the field of feminist botany she is best known for her book Botany, sexuality, and women's writing 1760-1830 : from modest shoot to forward plant (2007), following in the steps of Londa Schiebinger and Ann Shteir in the field of gender and science, detailing the exclusion of women from botany after Linnaeus' classification was published in English (1783–1785), because the sexual reproduction of plants was considered harmful to 'female modesty'. Since then she has continued to research and publish on the intersections of literature, women and science, and in particular botany.

She has been Reviews Editor for Literature for the Journal of Eighteenth Century Studies. Membership of learned societies include the British Society of Literature and Science, the British Association of Romantic Studies, the British Society for Eighteenth-Century Studies and the International Gothic Association. Dr George publishes under the pen name of Sam George.

Publications 
Select publications include;

2015
 George, S. The Poetry of Erasmus Darwin. The Encyclopedia of British Literature 1660-1789. Day, G. & Lynch, J. (eds.). Wiley Blackwell

2014
 George, S. Carl Linnaeus, Erasmus Darwin and Anna Seward: Botanical Poetry and Female Education  Mar 2014 In : Science and Education. 23, 3, p. 673-694 22 p.
 George, S. Girlhood's Tender Shoots: Education, Sexuality and Natural Science in Juvenile Literature for Girls 1760-1840 Pickering and Chatto.
 George, S. Teaching Vampire Literature: Blood and Gore in the Academy  In : Gothic Studies. Forthcoming
 George, S. The Tulip: A Cultural History Reaktion Books.

2013
 George, S. He make in the mirror no reflect': undead aesthetics and mechanical reproduction -'Dorian Gray', 'Dracula', and David Reed's 'vampire painting  1 Dec 2013 Open Graves, Open Minds: Representations of Vampires and the Undead from the Enlightenment to the Present Day  George, S. & Hughes, B. (eds.). Manchester: University of Manchester Press, p. 56-78 22 p.
 George, S. Foreword  Dec 2013 The Vampire Goes to College: Essays on Teaching with the Undead. Nevarez, L. A. (ed.). New Jersey: McFarland
 George, S. (ed.) & Hughes, B. (ed.) Open Graves, Open Minds: Representations of Vampires and the Undead from the Enlightenment to the Present Day  University of Manchester Press. 320 p.
 George, S. Sam George In Conversation With Sir Christopher Frayling  Jul 2013 Misdirect Movies. Rimmer, J. & Bracey, A. (eds.). Manchester: Cornerhouse Publications, p. 60-67 7 p.
 George, S. & Hughes, B. Introduction: undead reflections: the sympathetic vampire and its monstrous other  May 2013 In : Gothic Studies. 15, 1, p. 1-7
 George, S. (ed.) & Hughes, B. (ed.) Open Graves, Open Minds: Vampires and the Undead in Modern Culture  May 2013 In : Gothic Studies. 15, 1
 George, S. 'Not Strictly Proper for A Female Pen': Anna Seward Nineteenth-Century Literary Criticism. Gale

2011
 George, S. & Martin, A. (eds.) Botanising Women: Transmission, Translation and European Exchange  Oct 2011 Special Issue: Women and Notany. Journal of Literature and Science 4: 1
 George, S. Epistolary Exchange: the Familiar Letter and the Female Botanist, 1760-1820  Oct 2011 In : Journal of Literature and Science. 4, 1, p. 12-29 18 p.1
 George, S. & Martin, A. E. Introduction. Botanising Women: Transmission, Translation and European Exchange In : Journal of Literature and Science. 4, 1, p. 1-11

2010
 George, S. Animated beings: enlightenment entomology for girls  Dec 2010 In : British Journal for Eighteenth-Century Studies. 33, 4, p. 487-505 19 p.

2007
 
2006
 George, S. Cultivating the Botanical Woman: Rousseau, Wakefield and the Instruction of Ladies in Botany  In : Zeitschrift fur Padagogische Historiographie. 12, 1, p. 3-11

2005
 George, S. 'Not Strictly Proper For A Female Pen': Eighteenth-Century Poetry and the Sexuality of Botany  In : Comparative Critical Studies. 2, 2, p. 191-210
 George, S. Linnaeus in letters and the cultivation of the female mind: "Botany in an English dress"  In : British Journal for Eighteenth-Century Studies. 28, 1, p. 1-18
 George, S. The cultivation of the female mind: enlightened growth, luxuriant decay and botanical analogy in eighteenth-century texts In : History of European Ideas. 31, 2, p. 209-223

References

Bibliography

Academia

Media

Reviews (Peer reviewed journals)

Reviews (other)

Related work 
 
 
 

Year of birth missing (living people)
Living people
British women writers
British feminist writers
Academics of the University of Hertfordshire
Alumni of the University of York